The Weird Sisters are characters in William Shakespeare's play Macbeth.

Weird Sisters may also refer to:

 Weird Sisters (Gargoyles), fairy characters in Gargoyles
 The Weird Sisters (Harry Potter), a fictional rock band in the Harry Potter series
 The Weird Sisters (novel), a book by Eleanor Brown
 Weird Sisters, nickname of the fictional Brides of Dracula
 The Three Weird Sisters, a 1948 British film
 Three Weird Sisters (band), a filk band based in Atlanta, Georgia
 The Weird Sisters, Prudence, Agatha & Dorcas, characters from Chilling Adventures of Sabrina.

See also

 Wyrd Sisters, a Discworld novel by Terry Pratchett
 Wyrd Sisters (band), a Canadian folk group

 Wayward Sisters (disambiguation)
 Sister (disambiguation)
 Weird (disambiguation)